Lis Verhoeven (also spelled Liz Verhoeven) (11 March 1931 in Frankfurt am Main, Germany – 2 July 2019) was a German actress and theatre director.

Biography
Verhoeven was the daughter of Paul Verhoeven; she was the first wife of Mario Adorf, by whom she had a daughter, Stella Maria Adorf, also an actress.

References

External links

Doris Mattes Agency Munich 

1931 births
2019 deaths
Actors from Frankfurt
German television actresses
German theatre directors
People from Hesse-Nassau
20th-century German actresses
21st-century German actresses